The 2020 Indiana Fever season was the franchise's 21st season in the Women's National Basketball Association (WNBA). The regular season tipped off on July 25, 2020 versus the Washington Mystics.

During the off-season the Fever announced that head coach Pokey Chatman would not return for the 2020 season.  Chatman was replaced by Marianne Stanley. This will be Stanley's first head coaching job in the WNBA.  She was previously an assistant with the Washington Mystics, Los Angeles Sparks, and New York Liberty.

Also, it was announced that the Bankers Life Fieldhouse would undergo renovations, which would force the Fever to host home games at the Hinkle Fieldhouse for the 2020 season.

This WNBA season will feature an all-time high 36 regular-season games. However, the plan for expanded games was put on hold on April 3, when the WNBA postponed its season due to the COVID-19 pandemic. Under a plan approved on June 15, the league is scheduled to hold a shortened 22-game regular season at IMG Academy, without fans present, starting on July 24.

The Fever started the season in a back and forth manner.  The Fever went 2–2 in their first four games, alternating wins and losses.  The season took a downward turn as the Fever lost five of their next seven games to be 4–7 at the halfway mark of the season.  The second half started with a win, but was marred by an eight game losing streak.  The Fever won the next to last game, and lost on the final day of the season to finish 6–16.  Their .273 winning percentages, was the third worst in franchise history.

Transactions

WNBA Draft 
The Fever will make the following selections in the 2020 WNBA Draft.

Trades and roster changes

Roster

Game log

Regular season

|- style="background:#fcc;"
| 1
| July 25
| Washington Mystics
| L 76–101
| K. Mitchell (25)
| Achonwa (7)
| Tied (3)
| IMG Academy0
| 0–1
|- style="background:#bbffbb;"
| 2
| July 29
| Phoenix Mercury
| W 106–100
| T. Mitchell (24)
| McCowan (13)
| K. Mitchell (5)
| IMG Academy0
| 1–1
|- style="background:#fcc;"
| 3
| July 31
| Dallas Wings
| L 73–76
| Tied (11)
| Tied (8)
| Allemand (11)
| IMG Academy0
| 1–2

|- style="background:#bbffbb;"
| 4
| August 2
| Atlanta Dream
| W 93–77
| K. Mitchell (23)
| Allemand (7)
| Allemand (9)
| IMG Academy0
| 2–2
|- style="background:#fcc;"
| 5
| August 5
| Los Angeles Sparks
| L 75–86
| K. Mitchell (24)
| Dupree (7)
| T. Mitchell (5)
| IMG Academy0
| 2–3
|- style="background:#fcc;"
| 6
| August 7
| Minnesota Lynx
| L 80–87
| Tied (15)
| McCowan (12)
| Allemand (6)
| IMG Academy0
| 2–4
|- style="background:#bbffbb;"
| 7
| August 9
| Washington Mystics
| W 91–84
| K. Mitchell (29)
| McCowan (11)
| Allemand (5)
| IMG Academy0
| 3–4
|- style="background:#fcc;"
| 8
| August 11
| Las Vegas Aces
| L 79–98
| Dupree (20)
| McCowan (8)
| Allemand (6)
| IMG Academy0
| 3–5
|- style="background:#bbffbb;"
| 9
| August 13
| New York Liberty
| W 86–79
| T. Mitchell (19)
| McCowan (13)
| Allemand (5)
| IMG Academy0
| 4–5
|- style="background:#fcc;"
| 10
| August 15
| Los Angeles Sparks
| L 76–90
| K. Mitchell (25)
| T. Mitchell (8)
| Tied (4)
| IMG Academy0
| 4–6
|- style="background:#fcc;"
| 11
| August 18
| Connecticut Sun
| L 62–84
| K. Mitchell (15)
| Allemand (8)
| Tied (5)
| IMG Academy0
| 4–7
|- style="background:#bbffbb;"
| 12
| August 20
| Seattle Storm
| W 90–84
| Burke (23)
| McCowan (10)
| Allemand (6)
| IMG Academy0
| 5–7
|- style="background:#fcc;"
| 13
| August 22
| Chicago Sky
| L 76–87
| Dupree (18)
| Cox (6)
| Allemand (7)
| IMG Academy0
| 5–8
|- style="background:#fcc;"
| 14
| August 25
| Seattle Storm
| L 74–87
| Burke (17)
| McCowan (11)
| Tied (5)
| IMG Academy0
| 5–9
|- style="background:#fcc;"
| 15
| August 29
| Dallas Wings
| L 78–82
| K. Mitchell (19)
| Dupree (9)
| K. Mitchell (4)
| IMG Academy0
| 5–10
|- style="background:#fcc;"
| 16
| August 31
| Chicago Sky
| L 77–100
| McCowan (15)
| McCowan (11)
| Allemand (10)
| IMG Academy0
| 5–11

|- style="background:#fcc;"
| 17
| September 1
| Atlanta Dream
| L 90–102
| Tied (20)
| Tied (7)
| Tied (5)
| IMG Academy0
| 5–12
|- style="background:#fcc;"
| 18
| September 3
| Phoenix Mercury
| L 81–105
| K. Mitchell (16)
| Achonwa (10)
| Dupree (5)
| IMG Academy0
| 5–13
|- style="background:#fcc;"
| 19
| September 5
| Connecticut Sun
| L 77–96
| K. Mitchell (16)
| McCowan (7)
| Allemand (8)
| IMG Academy0
| 5–14
|- style="background:#fcc;"
| 20
| September 8
| Las Vegas Aces
| L 86–92
| K. Mitchell (24)
| McCowan (9)
| Allemand (8)
| IMG Academy0
| 5–15
|- style="background:#bbffbb;"
| 21
| September 10
| New York Liberty
| W 85–75
| Dupree (22)
| Dupree (6)
| Dupree (7)
| IMG Academy0
| 6–15
|- style="background:#fcc;"
| 22
| September 12
| Minnesota Lynx
| L 86–98
| K. Mitchell (20)
| McCowan (9)
| Allemand (9)
| IMG Academy0
| 6–16

Awards and honors

Standings

Statistics

Regular season

Source:

References

External links 
 Official website of the Indiana Fever

2020 WNBA season
2020
2020 in sports in Indiana